WYFF (channel 4) is a television station licensed to Greenville, South Carolina, United States, serving Upstate South Carolina and Western North Carolina as an affiliate of NBC. Owned by Hearst Television, the station maintains studios on Rutherford Street (west of US 276) in northwest Greenville, and its transmitter is located near Caesars Head State Park in northwestern Greenville County.

History
The station first signed on the air on December 31, 1953, as WFBC-TV; it was the fifth television station to sign on in South Carolina, and transmitted its signal from a tower located on Paris Mountain. The station was owned by the Peace family and their News-Piedmont Publishing Company alongside local newspapers The Greenville News and The Greenville Piedmont, and was a sister station to WFBC radio (1330 AM, now WYRD, and 93.7 FM). For its first two years on the air, the station operated from studio facilities located on Paris Mountain before moving to its current location on Rutherford Street in 1955. Norvin Duncan was the station's first news anchor, moving from the sister AM radio station.

In 1961, the News-Piedmont Publishing Company purchased WBIR-AM-FM and WBIR-TV in Knoxville, Tennessee from the former Taft Broadcasting Company.  News-Piedmont merged with Southern Broadcasting to form Multimedia, Inc., with WFBC-AM-FM-TV as the company's flagship stations.  WFBC-TV began transmitting locally produced programming in color in February 1967. In the mid-1970s, the station implemented the well-known "Arrow 4" as its logo, which was used in one form or another for many years until 1991.

In 1983, due to new rules set by the Federal Communications Commission restricting common ownership of newspapers and broadcasting outlets in the same market, Multimedia sold off the WFBC stations. WFBC-TV and sister station WXII-TV in Winston-Salem, North Carolina were traded to the Pulitzer Publishing Company in exchange for KSDK in St. Louis. On March 3, the station changed its call letters to WYFF-TV (standing for its slogan "We're Your Friend Four," which was used from 1979 to 1991). The change was made due to an FCC rule in effect at the time that stated that two stations in the same market, but with different owners needed to have different call letters. Although Pulitzer closed on its purchase of WXII later in the year, the acquisition of WYFF wouldn't be finalized for another two years until January 1985 as Pulitzer had to sell off WLNE-TV in Providence in order to comply with FCC ownership limits of the time that limited the number of stations one company can own to twelve; in the interim, Pulitzer took over the operations of WYFF through a time brokerage agreement with Multimedia. In 1998, Hearst-Argyle bought Pulitzer's entire television division, including WYFF-TV.

On June 23, 1985, the original WYFF studio building was damaged in a fire causing the station to knock off the air for two hours before its evening newscast.

Programming
Syndicated programs broadcast on WYFF (as of September 2022) includes Live with Kelly and Ryan, Access Hollywood, The Jennifer Hudson Show, The Kelly Clarkson Show, Entertainment Tonight and Inside Edition. The station carries the majority of the NBC network schedule; however, it preempts the live broadcast of the fourth hour of Today, hosted by Hoda Kotb and Jenna Bush Hager (which is shown only on overnights at 2 a.m.). It delays the Saturday edition of Today for one hour due to its morning newscast.

One of the station's popular children's programs was Monty's Rascals, debuting in 1960, hosted by Monty DuPuy and Stowe Hoyle as Mr. Doohickey (wearing a hat with an old Santa's beard), both of whom served as weathermen at channel 4. The show was moved to Saturday mornings in 1970, to accommodate the soap opera Bright Promise. The program continued as The Rascal's Clubhouse after DuPuy's departure in 1978 and continued until 1982; Hoyle retired two years later. An earlier version of the program, Kids Korral, was hosted by Johnny Wright.

WFBC was one of the few NBC affiliates that did not clear The Monkees during its initial first run on NBC from 1966 to 1968 meaning western Carolina and northeast Georgia viewers missed out on the popular TV band starring Michael Nesmith, Micky Dolenz, Peter Tork and Davy Jones.

WFBC/WYFF also preempted certain NBC programs over the years (most of which ended up on WAXA-TV (channel 40, now WMYA-TV); consisting mostly of children's programs including Alvin and the Chipmunks (which briefly aired on the station until 1986, when it moved to WAXA until it returned to WYFF in the late 1980s), Underdog, Kidd Video, Spider-Man and His Amazing Friends and Foofur (all four of which aired instead on WAXA-TV throughout their runs). It also declined to carry Saturday Night Live (then known as NBC's Saturday Night) from its debut in 1975 to early 1978, NBC's daytime reruns of The Facts of Life from during the 1984–1985 season (which aired on WAXA-TV), game shows The Who, What, or Where Game (in favor of the local talk show Today in The Piedmont), Super Password and Time Machine (both of which aired throughout their runs on WAXA-TV) and the soap opera Santa Barbara (which was initially cleared by the station during its first few years on January 6, 1986, after the low-rated syndicated TV show America aired its final episode on January 3, 1986). WYFF continued to air Santa Barbara until its 1993 cancellation.

WYFF 4 became the first television station in the Greenville–Spartanburg–Asheville market to begin broadcasting on a 24-hour daily schedule in the fall of 1988. It ran NBC's early morning news program NBC News Overnight and simulcasts of the Home Shopping Spree and CNN Headline News during the overnight hours around this time. It ran Nightside in 1991. The Home Shopping Spree simulcast was dropped in the mid-1990s with the CNN Headline News simulcast being discontinued in 2005 (as the channel transitioned from its news wheel format into a combination of discussion programs at night and rolling news programming during the day), in favor of a mix of NBC late night shows, drama reruns, lifestyle programs and paid programming during the overnight hours.

WYFF has acquired the rights to the preseason games of the Carolina Panthers starting in the 2014–15 season.

News operation
WYFF presently broadcasts 38½ hours of locally produced newscasts each week (with six hours on weekdays, four hours on Saturdays and 4½ hours on Sundays). During the 1960s, channel 4 personalities included Dave Partridge, who succeeded Duncan as anchor of the station's 6:00 and 11:00 p.m. newscasts and Jim Phillips (who died in 2003, was also known as "the voice of the Clemson Tigers" radio broadcasts). In 1976, Kenn Sparks joined WFBC-TV as its evening anchor; earlier that year, the station expanded its 6:00 p.m.The Scene at Six newscast. The 1980s brought new talent to the station including anchor James Baker, sportscasters J. D. Hayworth (later an Arizona Congressman), Roger Berry and Mark Marino and weatherman Charlie Gertz. The station rebranded its newscasts from Action News 4 to NewsCenter 4 in the early 1980s.

Following the Pulitzer purchase, new arrivals at WYFF included Carl Clark, Kim Brattain and Carol Anderson – now Carol Clarke and co-anchor of the 5:00, 6:00 and 11:00 p.m. newscasts. In the late 1980s, Anderson was replaced by Annette Estes, who had previously worked at rival CBS affiliate WSPA-TV (channel 7). Stan Olenik also joined the station from WSPA-TV; Clarke returned when Estes left the station in 1992. In 1989, the station rebranded it's newscasts as News 4. Charlie Gertz retired as evening meteorologist in 1991.

On January 26, 2010, WYFF began broadcasting its local newscasts in widescreen standard definition. On April 22, 2012, beginning with the station's weekend 6:00 p.m. newscast, the station began upgraded its newscasts to high definition; the station also upgraded its weather and news graphics systems to HD with the transition. This was followed the next day by the debut of a new set for its newscasts.

Notable current on-air staff
 Carol Clarke – anchor
 Jane Robelot – contributing/special assignment reporter

Notable former on-air staff
 Tony Aiello – general assignment reporter, 1988–1991 (now with WCBS-TV in New York City)
 Michael Cogdill – anchor, 1989–2021 (now with HeartStrong Media)
 J. D. Hayworth – sports anchor (later a Representative from Arizona)
 Mike Seidel – meteorologist (now at The Weather Channel)

Technical information

Subchannels
The station's digital signal is multiplexed:

Digital subchannel 4.2 originally carried "WYFF 4 Weather Plus," which operated as an affiliate of NBC Weather Plus. After NBC Weather Plus ceased operations on December 1, 2008, WYFF converted the subchannel as a locally operated weather service, using the Weather Plus network's graphical user interface. On January 1, 2011, the subchannel changed its affiliation to This TV as a result of Hearst Television's affiliation agreement with the network.

Analog-to-digital conversion
WYFF signed on its digital signal on May 1, 2002. The station discontinued regular programming on its analog signal, over VHF channel 4, on June 12, 2009, the official date in which full-power television stations in the United States transitioned from analog to digital broadcasts under federal mandate. The station's digital signal moved from its pre-transition UHF channel 59, which was among the high band UHF channels (52-69) that were removed from broadcasting use as a result of the transition, to UHF channel 36 (the UHF channel 36 allocation was previously used for the analog signals of WCNC-TV and WATL in the respective nearby markets of Charlotte and Atlanta). Through the use of PSIP, digital television receivers display the station's virtual channel as its former VHF analog channel 4.

As part of the SAFER Act, WYFF kept its analog signal on the air until July 12 to inform viewers of the digital television transition through a loop of public service announcements from the National Association of Broadcasters.

Translators
WYFF operates nine digital translators across the mountains of western North Carolina. These translators serve as low-power, limited-area repeaters that bring the network's signal to towns in deep mountain valleys where the parent signal is blocked by the surrounding terrain. All translators use virtual channel 4.

Out-of-market cable carriage
In recent years, WYFF has been carried on cable in multiple areas outside of the Greenville–Spartanburg–Asheville media market, including cable systems within the Aiken and Columbia markets in South Carolina, areas of North Carolina within the Charlotte and Chattanooga, Tennessee markets, the Tri-Cities market in Tennessee and Virginia, and the Atlanta market in Georgia.

During the CATV period in the 1970s and 1980s, WYFF was once carried as far east as Cabarrus County, North Carolina and also as far north as Bristol, Virginia.

References

External links
WYFF4.com - WYFF 4's official website

NBC network affiliates
MeTV affiliates
Television channels and stations established in 1953
1953 establishments in South Carolina
Hearst Television
YFF